is the second studio album by Japanese entertainer Miho Nakayama. Released through King Records on December 18, 1985, the album features the single "Namaiki".

The album peaked at No. 13 on Oricon's albums chart and sold over 95,000 copies.

Track listing

Charts

References

External links
 
 
 

1985 albums
Miho Nakayama albums
Japanese-language albums
King Records (Japan) albums